Shaoang Liu (born 13 March 1998) is a Hungarian Olympic gold medalist short track speed skater. He is the younger brother of teammate Shaolin Sándor Liu, and has won two golds and two bronzes represent Hungary at the Winter Olympics in 2018 and 2022 Winter Olympics in short track speed skating. The gold medals were the first ever team gold, and the first ever individual gold at the Winter Olympics for Hungary.  He changed his nationality and may represent China after 2023.

Early life

Liu was born to a Chinese father and a Hungarian mother in Budapest on 13 March 1998. He started the sport in 2006 and trained in China for a year. He studied Sports Manager at the University of Debrecen.

Career
At the 2018 Winter Olympics held in At Pyeongchang, Liu represented Hungary in short track speed skating.  2018, he won gold with Team Hungary in the 5000 m men's relay, whose winning time was a world record. This team gold was also the first ever gold medal won at the Winter Olympics by Hungary.

at the 2022 Winter Olympics held in Beijing, he became the most successful winter Olympian in 2022 after winning two bronze medals and one gold at the Beijing Olympics in 2022.  He won a gold in 500 m, having led from start to finish. This win was the first ever individual gold medal at the Winter Olympics for Hungary. He won an individual bronze in the 1,000 m, and as part of the team in the 2,000m mixed relay.

In November 2022, Liu and his brother requested consent from the Hungarian National Skating Federation to allow them to change nationality, a request which was granted in December, but they would need to sit out competing for 12 months when the nationality is changed.

See also
List of Olympic medalist families

References

External links

1998 births
Living people
Hungarian male short track speed skaters
Olympic short track speed skaters of Hungary
Olympic medalists in short track speed skating
Olympic gold medalists for Hungary
Olympic bronze medalists for Hungary
Short track speed skaters at the 2018 Winter Olympics
Short track speed skaters at the 2022 Winter Olympics
Medalists at the 2018 Winter Olympics
Medalists at the 2022 Winter Olympics
Short track speed skaters at the 2016 Winter Youth Olympics
World Short Track Speed Skating Championships medalists
Hungarian sportspeople of Chinese descent
Speed skaters from Budapest